Gudur is one of the largest villages in BibiNagar Mandal in Nalgonda district, Telangana, India.

References

Villages in Nalgonda district